Ossancora is a genus of thorny catfish native to tropical South America.

Species
There are currently four species considered to belong to this genus:
 Ossancora asterophysa Birindelli & Sabaj Pérez, 2011
 Ossancora eigenmanni (Boulenger, 1895)
 Ossancora fimbriatus (Kner, 1855)
 Ossancora punctatus (Kner, 1853)

References

Doradidae
Fish of South America
Catfish genera
Freshwater fish genera